Yew Chung International School of Qingdao (YCIS Qingdao, simplified Chinese: 青岛耀中国际学校; traditional Chinese: 青岛耀中國際學校) is an accredited K2-Year 13 international school for boys and girls in Qingdao, China.

Origins and history
The Ministry of Education of the People's Republic of China has accredited the Yew Chung International School of Qingdao for the enrollment of children of foreign nationals. The bilingual (English and Mandarin) school serves students ages 2 to 18 (K2 to Year 13) and provides early childhood education or kindergarten, primary school education, and secondary school education. 

YCIS Qingdao is part of the Yew Chung Foundation, which operates campuses in Shanghai, Beijing, Chongqing, Hong Kong, and California.

Timeline
 2006 – YCIS Qingdao is founded.
 2008 – YCIS Qingdao raises relief donations for victims of the Sichuan earthquake, sparking the beginnings of the Seeds of Hope project.
 2011 – YCIS Qingdao opens a 5-story, purpose-built campus in Huangdao District, Qingdao. 
 2016 – YCIS Qingdao is formally accredited by the Council of International Schools (CIS), the New England Association of Schools and Colleges (NEASC), and the National Centre for School Curriculum and Textbook Development (NCCT).
 2016 – YCIS Qingdao becomes an IB Diploma Programme World School.

References 
 Schools.ac http://www.schools.ac/1499-Yew-Chung-International-School-of-Qingdao-Qingdao-China.html 
 Aoehome.com http://www.aoehome.com/school/other/Yew-Chung-International-School-of-Qingdao-2469
 Qingdaonese http://www.qingdaonese.com/ycis-huangdao-opens-new-campus/

Network of Schools
 Yew Chung International School of Hong Kong
 Yew Chung International School of Shanghai
 Yew Chung International School of Beijing
 Yew Chung International School of Chongqing
 Yew Chung International School of Qingdao
 Yew Chung International School of Silicon Valley

Educational institutions established in 1932
International schools in Hong Kong
Cambridge schools in China
International schools in China
International Baccalaureate schools in China
Education in Qingdao
Schools in Shandong
1932 establishments in China

ko:야오중 국제학교
zh:青島耀中國際學校